The 2019 season is Washington Spirit's seventh season, competing in the National Women's Soccer League, the top division of women's soccer in the United States. The season is the first to be led by newly appointed head coach Richie Burke.

Club

Roster
The first-team roster of Washington Spirit.

 (INT)
 (INT)

 (FP) 
 (FP)

(MAT)

(INT)

(NTR)

 (FP) = Federation player
 (INT) = International roster player
 (MAT) = Maternity Leave
 (NTR) = National Team Replacement

Team management

Competitions

Preseason

Regular season

Regular season standings

Results summary

Results by round

Statistics

Appearances and goals

|-
|colspan="10"|Goalkeepers:
|-

|-
|colspan="10"|Defenders:
|-

|-
|colspan="10"|Midfielders:
|-

|-
|colspan="10"|Forwards:
|-

|}

Italics indicates player left team midway through season.

Goalkeepers

Transfers

In

Out

Loan In

Draft picks
Draft picks are not automatically signed to the team roster. Only those who are signed to a contract will be listed as transfers in. Only trades involving draft picks and executed during the 2019 NWSL College Draft will be listed in the notes.

Awards

Monthly Awards

NWSL Team of the Month

NWSL Weekly Awards

NWSL Player of the Week

NWSL Goal of the Week

NWSL Save of the Week

References

2019 National Women's Soccer League season